Takashi Yoshikawa (𠮷川 貴史, Yoshikawa Takashi, born 29 November 1994) is a Japanese field hockey player. He competed in the 2020 Summer Olympics.

He was a part of the Japan squad which won their first Asian Games gold medal in men's hockey in 2018.

References

External links

1994 births
Living people
Field hockey players at the 2018 Asian Games
Field hockey players at the 2020 Summer Olympics
Japanese male field hockey players
Male field hockey goalkeepers
Olympic field hockey players of Japan
Sportspeople from Shiga Prefecture
Asian Games medalists in field hockey
Medalists at the 2018 Asian Games
Asian Games gold medalists for Japan
2023 Men's FIH Hockey World Cup players
21st-century Japanese people